Summertime is a 2001 South Korean film directed by Park Jae-ho and starring Ryu Soo-young and Kim Ji-hyun. A remake of the controversial Philippine film Scorpio Nights (1985), the film was also inspired by the Gwangju massacre.

Plot
Set in the 1980s, Sang-ho is a student activist hiding out in a small rural village. He accidentally witnesses, through a hole on the floor of his second story room, a married couple having sex. He discovers he is a voyeur at heart and becomes bolder and bolder in his actions. One day, he gets an opportunity to play out his fantasies. When the husband is not home, Sang-ho goes downstairs. Imitating the husband's manner of foreplay even down to the sequence, the young man has sex with the wife. She, like Sang-ho, is a prisoner of the house. The second time he comes to her, he touches her in a different way which makes her turn around and discover that there is a stranger in her bed. But this does not deter her as she reaches out to him for an intense embrace. The husband, Tae-yeol, is an ex-policeman fired for alleged corruption, and his wife Hee-ran, who was raped by him as a young girl, for the sake of status quo has ended up as his wife and prisoner.

Cast
Ryu Soo-young as Sang-ho
Kim Ji-hyun as Hee-ran
Choi Cheol-ho as Tae-yeol
Song Ok-sook as Gi-ok
Bae Jeong-yun as Young-mi
Choi Seong-min
Yun Yeong-keol
Jang Seong-won
Kim Seon-hwa
Lee Seung-hun
Ahn Byeong-kyeong
Park Hoon-jung as child in the playground

References

External links
 
 
 

2001 films
2000s romantic thriller films
South Korean romantic thriller films
Erotic romance films
2000s Korean-language films
South Korean remakes of foreign films
Films set in the 1980s
2000s erotic thriller films
South Korean erotic thriller films
2000s South Korean films